Geng Xin  (born ) is a Chinese male volleyball player. He was part of the China men's national volleyball team at the 2014 FIVB Volleyball Men's World Championship in Poland. At club level, He plays for Panasonic Panthers.

Clubs
 Shandong (2014)

References

1989 births
Living people
Chinese men's volleyball players
Place of birth missing (living people)
Volleyball players at the 2014 Asian Games
Asian Games competitors for China
21st-century Chinese people